The 1949 Baltimore Colts season was their third as a franchise and last season in the AAFC before moving to the NFL. The team failed to improve on their previous season's output of 7–7, winning only one game.

Season schedule

League standings

References

Baltimore Colts (1947–1950) seasons
Baltimore Colts